Pharos (4 April 1920 – 30 April 1937) was a British bred thoroughbred racehorse and a leading sire in Great Britain and Ireland.

Pedigree
Bred and raced by Edward Stanley, 17th Earl of Derby, he was a brother to the stakeswinners, Fair Isle (1927) and Fairway (1925) who won 31 races and £71,635 between them. They were by the successful sire, Phalaris, their dam the staying mare, Scapa Flow by Chaucer. Pharos's maximum distance was approximately 1¼ miles and Fairway could stay much further and was altogether a better racehorse. Both Pharos and Fairway were outstanding successes at stud where they both sired classic winners of a high standard. However, Pharos has proved the more influential in the long run and now stands four-square on the pre-eminent sire line in world racing.

Racing record
Pharos won six of his nine starts at age two and three of his nine starts at age three when he also ran second to Papyrus in the 1923 Epsom Derby. Racing at age four, Pharos won four of seven starts, notably beating Prix de l'Arc de Triomphe winner Parth in the ten furlong Champion Stakes at Newmarket Racecourse. Racing at age five, Pharos did not win in his first four starts but then in the last race of his career, won his second consecutive edition of the Duke of York Handicap by six lengths.

Stud record
Retired to stud duty having won fourteen of his thirty career starts, Pharos first stood at Woodland Stud in Newmarket for the 1926 season. In 1928 he was sent to stand at Haras d'Ouilly in France where he remained until his death in 1937. Pharos was the leading sire in Britain and Ireland in 1931 and the leading sire in France in 1938.

Pharos sired 11 high class stallions including Pharis, an undefeated galloper whose wins included the 1939 Prix du Jockey Club and the Grand Prix de Paris and who was the leading sire in France in 1944. However, by far his most important son was the undefeated Nearco, described by Thoroughbred Heritage as "one of the greatest racehorses of the Twentieth Century" and "one of the most important sires of the century".

Pharos sired the winners of 181 races worth £152,157.

Pedigree

See also
 List of Undefeated horses

External links
 Pharos at Thoroughbred Heritage
 Pharos' pedigree and partial racing stats

References

1920 racehorse births
1937 racehorse deaths
Racehorses bred in the United Kingdom
Racehorses trained in the United Kingdom
Champion Thoroughbred Sires of France
British Champion Thoroughbred Sires
Thoroughbred family 13-e
Chefs-de-Race